Fairmont Private Schools (Fairmont) is the largest and oldest secular, co-educational preschool - 12th grade private school in Orange County, California, United States. Fairmont consists of five campuses: Fairmont Preparatory Academy (9 - 12th grade), Anaheim Hills Campus (preschool - 8th grade), North Tustin Campus (pre-kindergarten - 8th grade), Historic Anaheim Campus (preschool - 8th grade), and San Juan Capistrano (preschool - 12th grade) which together aim to teach a consistent program from preschool through 12th grade.

History

1953 
Fairmont was founded in June 1953 by Kenneth Holt, an educator who pushed for greater instructional autonomy than the public school system would allow for. What is now Orange County's oldest and largest secular, co-educational P-12 private school first began as a summer school program, which run out of Mr. Holt's Anaheim home. It was popular with its families, who convinced Mr. Holt to remodel his house and open a new school in September of that same year.
The school was founded in 1953 by a former public school teacher, Kenneth W. Holt after seeing a need for smaller class sizes and phonics approached teaching. The original campus still exists today and serves as the Fairmont Schools Historic Anaheim Campus.

1955  
Word quickly spread and the demand for what Fairmont was offering led the entrepreneur to take a risk and purchase a larger space – the Carroll Estate on Mable Street in Anaheim. The new location, which is now known as Fairmont Historic Anaheim Campus, welcomed 65 K-8 grade students that September. In 1959, Mr. Holt and his new wife Helen expanded Fairmont, making additional enhancements in phonics and other programs. The school's enrollment grew to over 500 students by 1979, when Mr. Holt turned over the leadership to his stepson, David R. Jackson, another entrepreneur. Today, the Historic Anaheim Campus offers two International Baccalaureate Programmes spanning preschool through 8th grade.

1985  
Mr. and Mrs. Jackson saw the need to expand Fairmont's geographic reach and to extend its very successful personalized and highly academic education to preschool children. Searching for the best existing preschool they could find, they traveled all across Southern California until they found and purchased the Town & Country Preschool in Yorba Linda. Over the next several years, Fairmont's first preschool grew to include elementary grades, necessitating a move in 1993 to a larger location — what is now the P-8 Fairmont Anaheim Hills Campus.

1993  
David Jackson decided to open "Fairmont High School" (now Fairmont Preparatory Academy]) in 1993. The inaugural freshman class of 45 students occupied a newly constructed building on the Historic Anaheim Campus. The following year, the school moved to its current location on the Philip A. Stanton Estate on Sequoia Avenue in Anaheim. Each year, another grade level was added, necessitating the purchase of additional parcels of land along the way. Today, students from all over the world come to "the Prep" for its sports and arts programs, as well as college counseling.

1998 
Fairmont expanded in 1998 when Mr. Jackson acquired Edgewood Private School (now called Fairmont North Tustin Campus) in North Tustin.

2020 
Mr. Jackson had a longstanding dream of bringing Fairmont's now-famous P-12 college preparatory education to South Orange County families. Working in concert with his son Chad – who stepped into a leadership role as Fairmont's president in 2018 – Mr. Jackson saw his dream realized in 2020, with the purchase of a campus in San Juan Capistrano. The campus has the distinction of being one of only a handful of private schools in Orange County to provide the full continuum of grades (P-12) on one campus.

In May 2022, Mark Muñoz, a wrestling coach at the San Juan Capistrano campus, was placed on administrative leave amid allegations he had encouraged playground boxing matches among his students. Muñoz issued a statement denying the allegations.

Awards and recognition

 Top School Award - 2016 Orange County Science & Engineering Fair
 Best Private School - 2015 and 2016 Parenting OC Magazine
 National Champions - 2016 United States Academic Pentathlon

References

Schools in Orange County, California
Private schools in California
1953 establishments in California